Live at Ronnie Scott's is a live album recorded by Jeff Beck, also available on DVD, Blu-ray and streaming, recorded at Ronnie Scott's Jazz Club, in November, 2007 and released on 10 November 2008. Other performers were Jason Rebello on keyboards, Vinnie Colaiuta on drums and Tal Wilkenfeld on bass. The version of "A Day in the Life" featured on this album was awarded a Grammy for Best Instrumental Rock performance. The version of "Scatterbrain" also featured on this album was placed in the hardest setlist, "Fjord of Swords", of the music video game Guitar Hero 5.

Track listing

Additional tracks are:
 "Blanket" (feat. Imogen Heap)
 "Rollin and Tumblin" (feat. Imogen Heap)
 "People Get Ready" (feat. Joss Stone)

Personnel 
 Guitar – Jeff Beck
 Bass – Tal Wilkenfeld
 Drums – Vinnie Colaiuta
 Keyboards – Jason Rebello

References

Jeff Beck albums
2000 albums
Albums recorded at Ronnie Scott's Jazz Club